ITV Sport Channel was a short-lived digital sport television channel, that was owned by Carlton Communications and Granada plc. It was launched on 11 August 2001 and closed on 12 May 2002, precipitating ITV Digital's collapse over a month later.

The channel mostly broadcast live UEFA Champions League games alongside other sports, and had two sister channels, ITV Sport Plus and ITV Sport Select.

Matt Smith, Tony Dorigo, Russell Osman, Bob Wilson, John Hendrie, Garry Nelson, Guy Havord, Guy Mowbray, Peter Drury, Jon Champion, David Fairclough, Paul Walsh, Jim Beglin, Simon Hill, Peter Stevenson, Carrie Frais, Lisa Rogers and Dave Beckett presented and commentated for the channel.

History

Champions Channel/ONsport
The ITV Sport Channel can trace its foundations back to 1999 when the then named ONdigital service acquired exclusive rights to screen every match from the UEFA Champions League, to supplement ITV's existing coverage of the competition. Two channels to show the matches were set up, entitled Champions on 28 and Champions on 99, reflecting the channel numbers these were broadcast on. Prior to the 2000-01 season, these channels were re-branded respectively as ONsport 1 and ONsport 2, after ONdigital had purchased rights to the ATP Masters Series tennis. Whilst ONsport 1 broadcast 24 hours a day, ONsport 2 timeshared with Carlton Cinema.

In June 2000, ONdigital successfully outbid BSkyB for the rights to show live matches from The Football League and the League Cup, for a massive £315m over three seasons, at least five times more than any broadcaster had previously bid for it. The launch of the ITV Sport Channel was announced in April 2001 and both ONsport 1 and ONsport 2 were closed down prior to its launch and the subsequent renaming of the ONdigital service to ITV Digital.

ITV Sport Channel
The channel was launched on 11 August 2001 with Manchester City v Watford in the First Division as the game shown. The channel was also available on NTL cable in addition to ITV Digital. However it did not broadcast on Sky or on Telewest.

Two spin-off channels titled called ITV Sport Plus and ITV Sport Select were also available as ITV Digital exclusives. ITV Sport Select showed the on-demand Premier League football matches from Sky Sports and ITV Sport Plus was available without charge to allow viewers to watch a match or sport event if there was a scheduling conflict.

Closure
The cost of the Football League deal proved one too many a burden for the struggling ITV Digital. The Football League refused to accept a £130m pay cut in its £315m deal with the network, and would soon cause ITV Digital itself to be placed into administration on 27 March 2002. The collapse caused severe financial difficulties for lower-division football clubs who had budgeted for large incomes from the television contract.

Following the closure of the majority of the subscription channels on ITV Digital on 1 May 2002, the ITV Sport Channel, however, continued to broadcast, being re-designated as a free-to-air channel. The closure of the channel was announced two days later on 3 May, and closed as planned on 11 May, after its coverage of the Division 2 play-off final between Brentford and Stoke.

On August 1, 2002, the Football League sued ITV Digital's parent companies, Carlton and Granada, claiming that the firms had breached their contract in failing to deliver the guaranteed income. The League lost the case, with the judge ruling that it had "failed to extract sufficient written guarantees". The League then filed a negligence claim against its lawyers for failing to press for a written guarantee at the time of the deal with ITV Digital. This time it was awarded a paltry £4 in damages of the £150m it was seeking.

Programming
Throughout its time on air, football was the mainstay of the channel. In addition to live Football League coverage, the channel showed Saturday night primetime highlights from all three divisions. The UEFA Champions League coverage previously shown on ONsport moved to ITV Sport Channel to help to fill out the channel's schedule. As well as football, other sports were also covered, including ATP Masters Series tennis, snooker, British basketball and boxing from the United States. The channel also acquired secondary rights to European Cup rugby union.

Successor
Eventually, in 2017, ITV would launch a similar channel by the name ITV Box Office, showing pay-per-view boxing and wrestling events; that service also shut down shortly after in 2020.

References

Television channels and stations established in 2001
Television channels and stations disestablished in 2002
Defunct television channels in the United Kingdom
Sports television channels in the United Kingdom
ITV (TV network)
ITV Sport